Harlots is a British-American period drama television series created by Alison Newman and Moira Buffini and inspired by The Covent Garden Ladies by British historian Hallie Rubenhold. The series focuses on Margaret Wells, who runs a brothel in 18th-century London and struggles to secure a better future for her daughters in an unpredictable environment.

The series premiered on 27 March 2017 on ITV Encore in the United Kingdom, and on 29 March 2017 on Hulu in the United States. It was subsequently renewed for a second series that premiered on 11 July 2018 in the United States, and on 14 February 2019 in the UK via on-demand service StarzPlay, to which it moved after ITV Encore closed. On September 24, 2018, Harlots was renewed for a third season, which premiered in the United States on July 10, 2019, and in the UK the following day. On June 10, 2020, it was reported that Hulu had cancelled the series after three seasons. After this, the BBC acquired the UK rights to broadcast all three series, with the first two episodes of the first season aired on BBC Two on 5 August 2020.

Plot
In 1760s London, women's opportunities for economic advancement are either through marriage or sex work. The city's brothels are run by canny and determined businesswomen, such as Margaret Wells and Lydia Quigley, but there is a new morality on the rise. Religious evangelists demand the closure of brothels, and police are happy to launch brutal raids.

The show revolves around Wells' determination to improve her life and the lives of those in her "family" by moving her brothel to Greek Street in Soho to serve a wealthier clientele in Georgian society. Her move to Greek Street puts her into direct conflict with a rival madame, Lydia Quigley, for whom she had previously worked. Quigley operates an elite brothel in Golden Square that serves rich, influential people.

Cast and characters

Main
Samantha Morton as Margaret Wells, the intelligent and strategic madam of an up-and-coming brothel who is determined to improve her fortune; a former sex worker of Lydia Quigley's
Lesley Manville as Lydia Quigley, the ruthless madam of a posh brothel with clients from the judiciary, nobility, and upper echelons of Georgian society
Jessica Brown Findlay as Charlotte Wells, the eldest daughter of Margaret Wells and a witty courtesan who is coveted by society's elite
Eloise Smyth as Lucy Wells, the youngest and favoured daughter of Margaret Wells, and a reluctant sex worker who earns an arrangement with Lord Fallon
Dorothy Atkinson as Florence Scanwell, a religious zealot who opposes sex work and becomes a pawn for Lydia Quigley
Pippa Bennett-Warner as Harriet Lennox, a former slave of Nathaniel Lennox (a former lover of Margaret Wells) who is brought to England as his wife and mother of two children, and becomes a sex worker for Margaret Wells
Kate Fleetwood as Nancy Birch, a longtime friend and neighbour of Margaret Wells, whose sex work specialty is bondage and domination
Holli Dempsey as Emily Lacey, a fiery, opinionated and impulsive sex worker who deserts Margaret Wells for what she believes are better prospects at Lydia Quigley's brothel. Emily is the love interest of Charles Quigley
Douggie McMeekin as Charles Quigley, the inept son and aide of Lydia Quigley who takes a liking to Emily Lacey (season 1–2)
Edward Hogg as Thomas Haxby, the estate manager of the house where Sir George Howard has Charlotte Wells live (season 1)
Richard McCabe as Justice Cunliffe, a judge in the employ of the Spartans, a shady society of elite gentlemen pursuing pleasure, rape and murder (season 1)
Danny Sapani as William North, the loving partner and common law husband of Margaret Wells, and a father figure to Charlotte and Lucy, who was born a free Black man in England to a woman who was a slave
Hugh Skinner as Sir George Howard, an aspiring Member of Parliament who has an arrangement with Charlotte Wells to receive her exclusive services (season 1)
Sebastian Armesto as Josiah Hunt (season 2)
Liv Tyler as Lady Isabella Fitzwilliam (season 2–3)
Julian Rhind-Tutt as Harcourt Fitzwilliam, Marquess of Blayne, the Archon of the Spartans (season 2-3)
Anna Calder-Marshall as Mrs. May, a retired bawd, once the mistress of Lydia Quigley's late father, who acts alternatively as a mother-like figure to Lydia, as well as being her casually cruel corruptor and tormentor (season 2-3).
Daisy Head as Kate Bottomley (season 3), a young woman sent to an insane asylum by her conservative family when they catch her in the climax of sexual passion with a boyfriend. In the asylum, Kate develops an unlikely mother-daughter bond with Lydia Quigley.

Recurring
Francesca Mills as Cherry Dorrington, a sex worker with dwarfism (series 2-3)
Roy Beck as Mr. Abbadon
Rosalind Eleazar as Violet Cross, a Black sex worker and adept thief who works for Nancy Birch
Rory Fleck Byrne as Daniel Marney (series 1)
Tim McInnerny as Lord Repton (series 1)
Fenella Woolgar as Lady Repton (series 1)
Con O'Neil as Nathaniel Lennox, a plantation and slave owner who is a former lover of Margaret Wells (series 1)
Bronwyn James as Fanny Lambert, a full-figured and good natured sex worker for Margaret Wells
Jordon Stevens as Amelia Scanwell, the daughter of Florence Scanwell
Alexa Davies as Betsey Fletcher, a sex worker who works for Nancy Birch (series 1)
Poppy Corby-Tuech as Marie-Louise D’Aubigne, a French-speaking sex worker in Lydia Quigley's house who decides to work for Margaret Wells (series1)
Josef Altin as Prince Rasselas, a molly boy who is an informant for Lydia Quigley (Series 1-2)
Jordan A. Nash as Jacob Wells North, the young son of Margaret Wells and William North
Ellie Heydon as Anne Pettifer, one of Lydia Quigley's girls
Steven Robertson as Robert Oswald
Timothy Innes as Benjamin Lennox, the eldest child from Nathaniel's former marriage
Ziggy Heath as Sam Holland
Hannah Dodd as Sophia Fitzwilliam, Lady Isabella's daughter who was conceived when her mother was raped by her brother (Series 2-3)
Ben Lambert as Lord Fallon, an aristocrat who takes an interest in Lucy Wells. 
Gerard Monaco as Mr. Armitage
Sean Hart as Sir Christopher Rutledge
Amy Dawson as Mary Cooper (series 1)
Eleanor Yates as Lady Caroline Howard, the wealthy wife of Sir George Howard who uses his dalliances to her advantage. (series 1)
Lottie Tolhurst as Kitty Carter, a sex worker for Margaret Wells
Eric Kofi-Abrefa as Noah Webster (season 2)
Angela Griffin as Elizabeth Harvey (Series 3)
Tom Fisher as Dr. Swinton (Series 3)
Lex Shrapnel as Lord James Croft (Season 3)
Jack Greenlees as Justice Stuart Knox, new Justice in town. (Series 3)
Aidan Cheng as Fredo Harvey (Series 3)
 Alfie Allen as Isaac Pincher (Series 3)
 Ash Hunter as Hal Pincher (Series 3)

  Luke Elkins as Young Boxer (Series 3)

Guest
Stephen Beckett as Mr. Lynch
John Lynch as Jonas Young
Michael Simkins as Justice Poulson
Nicola Coughlan as Hannah Dalton

Notes

Episodes

Series 1 (2017)

Series 2 (2018)

Series 3 (2019)

Production

Development
On 26 May 2016, it was announced that Hulu and ITV had given the co-production a programme order for a first series consisting of eight episodes. The series was set to be written by Moira Buffini and based upon an original idea by Buffini and Alison Newman. Directors were expected to include Coky Giedroyc and China Moo-Young. Lawrence Till was set as producer, with Alison Owen and Debra Hayward also on board to executive produce alongside Alison Carpenter, Buffini, and Newman. Production companies involved with the series include Monumental Pictures.

On 27 July 2017, it was announced at the annual Television Critics Association summer press tour that the programme had been renewed for a second series. On 23 April 2018, it was announced that the second season would premiere in the United States on 11 July 2018.

On April 12, 2019, it was announced that the third series was set to premiere in the United States on July 10, 2019.

Casting
Alongside the initial series order announcement, it was confirmed that the series would star Samantha Morton, Lesley Manville, and Jessica Brown Findlay. On 7 July 2016, it was announced that Eloise Smyth had been cast in a series regular role.

On 16 October 2017, it was announced that Liv Tyler was joining the main cast in series two.

Filming
Principal photography for series one was expected to commence in June 2016 in London. The majority of filming took place at Langleybury Mansion, Kings Langley, Hertfordshire. Chiswick House was used to replicate 18th-century London for the series, and additional scenes filmed at Historic Dockyard Chatham.

Reception
All three seasons have been received positively by critics. On the review aggregator website Rotten Tomatoes, the series holds an approval rating of 94% with an average rating of 7.08/10 based on 48 reviews. The website's critical consensus reads, "Harlots uses its titillating subject matter to draw the viewer into a deeper drama about the intersection of survival, business, and family." Metacritic, which uses a weighted average, assigned the season a score of 74 out of 100 based on 17 reviews, indicating "generally favorable reviews."

The second series holds an approval rating of 100% on Rotten Tomatoes based on 11 reviews, with an average rating of 7.83/10. The site's critics' consensus reads: "Harlots maintains its lavish grit and holds an 18th-century mirror up to our contemporary world of troubling gender-based suffering."

The third series holds an approval rating of 100% on Rotten Tomatoes based on 10 reviews, with an average rating of 7.31/10. The site's critics' consensus reads: "Delightfully uncomfortable, Harlots continues to push boundaries, but never at the expense of its deliciously campy fun." Metacritic reports a score of 77 out of 100 based on 4 critics, indicating "generally favorable reviews".

References

External links
 
 

2017 British television series debuts
2019 British television series endings
2010s British drama television series
Hulu original programming
ITV television dramas
Television series set in the 18th century
Television shows set in London
Television series by ITV Studios
Television shows based on books
English-language television shows
Prostitution in British television